Gardnerella is a genus of Gram-variable-staining facultative anaerobic bacteria.

Eponym
It is named after Hermann L. Gardner (1912–1982), an American bacteriologist who discovered it in 1955.

References

Bifidobacteriales
Bacteria genera